Gu Ruzhang or Ku Yu-cheung (1894–1952) was a Chinese martial artist who disseminated the Bak Siu Lum (Northern Shaolin) martial arts system across southern China in the early 20th century. Gu was known for his expertise in Iron Palm hand conditioning among other Chinese martial art training exercises. He has become a legendary heroic figure in some Chinese martial arts communities.

Gu was a son of Gu Lizhi, an adept of Tantui and Zhaquan and security and escort businessman (at the time, a common business for martial artists in China). Gu Yu-jeung inherited by his father's colleague Yán Jīwēnaka  嚴繼溫 the 10 North Shaolin routines, several weapon routines, and martial qigong techniques such as Iron Palm, Iron Body and Golden Bell. By such skills he was selected by the Central Guoshu Institute to teach Northern martial arts to the South as one of the "Five Southbound Tigers".

Gu also learned Zhaquan from Yú Zhènshēng; Yang Taijiquan and Bajiquan from Li Jinglin; and Baguazhang, Xingyiquan from Sūn Lùtáng.

Exploits 
Major events in Gu’s life are difficult to verify, as many of his achievements have been made legendary and may have been subject to gross exaggeration.

Gu was photographed breaking twelve un-spaced bricks with one strike. He entered the first National Wushu Fighting
Examination and placed in the top 15 competitors. He was also an instructor for the Guangdong Armed Forces.

According to legend, Gu, in the same spirit as the folk hero Huo Yuanjia, defeated foreign fighters who viewed the Chinese martial arts as an inferior system of fighting.

KYC using his iron-palm skill won back the fame of Chinese against a disrespect of a Russian circus horse—kicked everyone down from stage as these Chinese were attempting to win a bonus of letting the horse lie down. KYC palm-striked on its back and it lied down, severely damaged at its backbone, and died the next morning. KYC told the Russian owner he was not taking any money from him.

References 

Chinese martial artists
1952 deaths
Sportspeople from Jiangsu
People from Yancheng
1894 births